Joseph Preston Elliott (born August 2, 1986) is a former American football quarterback. He was signed by the Philadelphia Eagles as an undrafted free agent in 2010. He played for the Winnipeg Blue Bombers, BC Lions and Ottawa Redblacks of the Canadian Football League. He played college football at Purdue.

He currently runs the Elliot Quarterback Academy, and is currently employed as a member of the Indianapolis Colts scouting staff.

Early years

Elliott committed to Purdue University on July 2, 2004. Elliott also received FBS scholarship offers from Indiana and Washington State.

College career
Elliott played college football at Purdue. He was named co-captain for the 2009 season.  He was a 3-time Academic All-Big Ten and was a member of the 2007 Motor City Bowl-winning team over Central Michigan.

Statistics
Elliott's statistics are as follows:

Professional career

Philadelphia Eagles
Elliott was signed by the Philadelphia Eagles as an undrafted free agent on April 26, 2010. He was waived on June 10.

Winnipeg Blue Bombers
Elliott was signed by the Winnipeg Blue Bombers on July 20, 2010. On October 23, 2010, Elliott saw his first game action after starting quarterback Buck Pierce was injured the prior game, and second-string Steven Jyles, and third-string quarterbacks Alex Brink were knocked out the game due to shoulder injuries . He started the last two games of the season for the Blue Bombers, both losses.

He began the 2011 season as the second-string quarterback, but suffered a season-ending injury in the third game of the season.

In August 2012, Elliot was named the Blue Bombers starting quarterback.  In his first start on Aug. 16, the Bombers defeated the Hamilton Tiger-Cats by a score of 32–25. He completed 33 of 43 passes for 406 yards and a touchdown, becoming the first Blue Bomber quarterback to throw for over 400 yards since 2009, and was named the CFL’s Offensive Player of the Week twice.

Elliott was released by the Blue Bombers on March 26, 2013.

BC Lions
On May 24, 2013, Elliott was signed by the BC Lions as one of their quarterbacks. He was released on September 5, 2013, having not played in any regular season game with the Lions,  but was re-signed on September 18, 2013.

Ottawa Redblacks
On September 1, 2014, Elliott was signed by the Ottawa Redblacks after their backup Thomas DeMarco was injured for the rest of the 2014 season.

CFL statistics

References

External links
 Elliot Quarterback Academy
 Ottawa RedBlacks profile 
 Purdue profile

1986 births
Living people
American football quarterbacks
American players of Canadian football
Canadian football quarterbacks
BC Lions players
Ottawa Redblacks players
Philadelphia Eagles players
Purdue Boilermakers football players
Winnipeg Blue Bombers players
Sportspeople from Evansville, Indiana
Players of American football from Indiana